Coustaussa is a commune in the Aude department in Occitanie region in southern France. Its inhabitants are called Coustaussans.

Geography
The village is situated in the high valley of the Aude, on the river Sals between Arques and Couiza.

History
In the twelfth century, the lordship of Coustaussa belonged to the Vilar family. In the fourteenth century, it was in the hands of the de Fenouillet family. In 1367, by the marriage of Geraude de Fenouillet to Saix de Montesquieu, the lordship passed to the Montesquieus who kept it until the French Revolution.

During the night of 31 October to 1 November 1897, the parish priest of Coustaussa, the Abbé Antoine Gélis, was brutally murdered in his presbytery. The crime was not solved. The Abbé was found during the investigation to possess large sums of money which had not been taken by his assailants.

Administration
Since March 2001, the Mayor of the commune has been Robert Sanchez.

Population

Places of interest
Coustaussa has a ruined castle.

See also
Communes of the Aude department

References

External links

Coustaussa and its castle (in French)

Communes of Aude
Aude communes articles needing translation from French Wikipedia